The Surry River, sometimes incorrectly spelled as the Surrey River, a perennial river of the Glenelg Hopkins catchment, is located in the Western District of Victoria, Australia.

Location and features
The river descends  over its  course.

Etymology
The river was named by Thomas Mitchell on accepting the suggestion of the Henty Brothers.

See also

 List of rivers in Victoria

References

Glenelg Hopkins catchment
Rivers of Barwon South West (region)
Western District (Victoria)